Radoslav "Rade" Jovanović (1928–1986) was a Yugoslav composer and songwriter, best known for his legacy collection of sevdalinka folk songs from Bosnia and Herzegovina.

Biography 

He attended schools in Goražde and Priboj. With the breakout of the World War II at the age of 13 he joined the Yugoslav partisans. Consequently, some of his songs were dedicated to his brothers in arms. He contracted tuberculosis during the war but was able to survive harsh conditions of partisans life. After the war he had propelled as a youth leader before being sent to the island of Goli Otok, where he was held as a political prisoner due to the Cominform Resolution. 
He was released after 18 months and returned to his hometown.

His first successful song was "Često mlađan prošetam kraj Drine". Another one followed "Na obali Drine" performed by Zaim Imamović. Then Nada Mamula sang "Negdje u daljine", and "Sjecaš li se ratni druže" i "Bolan ti ležim jarane" were performed by Gvozden Radičević. Country-wide recognition shortly follows when he wins at the festival Ilidža 1964 with his song "Jablani se povijaju", performed by Safet Isović. That song alone won the awards for melody and lyrics from both - the audience and the nomination committee. His other three songs were also performed that same night and also took other awards. Next year he repeats his success at the very same festival Ilidža 1965, with the song "Ne pitaj me stara majko" performed by Nedeljko Bilkić, and establishes himself as one of the leading folk authors and prolific composer of warm, melodic and distinctive style.

Safet Isović performs "Kad sretneš Hanku" at the Beogradskom Sabor festival in 1970.  Seven years later, a number of music critics of former Yugoslavia, in a public poll carried out by the Belgrade Radio, voted and acclaimed "Kad sretneš Hanku" as the folk song of the decade.

His life and work had inspired many theater, film and radio authors who filmed documentaries about him and recorded radio shows, before and after his death 
He committed a suicide on April 15, 1986, and was buried in his hometown.

Songs 
He wrote over 500 songs.
River Drina, Bosnia and Herzegovina, his hometown Goražde and a natural beauty of the countryside to which he was born, people and their lives and fortunes, were source and constant themes and motifs of all Rade's songs, with most popular being:
 Prođoh Bosnom kroz gradove (co-authored with Dragiša Nedović)
 Goražde jedino u srcu mom
 Na obali Drine
 Kad sretneš Hanku
 Šta se ovo Bosnom čuje
 Svjetla moga grada
 Ah, meraka u večeri rane
 Tebi, majko, misli lete
 Ne pitaj me stara majko
 Negdje u daljine
 Jablani se povijaju
 Seja kose raspletala
 Malenim sokakom ne prolazim više
 Sumorna jesen
 Kad u maju ruže procvetaju
 Prolazi jesen
 Bolan ti ležim jarane
 U tuđoj zemlji
 Još ove noći čaše nam dajte
 Sve što mine, povratka mu nema
 Ne mogu te više svojom zvati
 Pomiluj mi pjesmo dušu

Tributes, memorials and dedications
Festival of song and sevdah "Rade Jovanović - Goražde 2005" was sevdah music tribute to Rade Jovanović opus, and was held in his hometown Goražde on 18 June 2005.
On 26 December 2018 memorial plaque was placed on Rade's home, house in Goražde where he was born and spent most of his life until his death in 1986. Idea was initiated by Center for Culture Goražde, while memorial was financed and put up by City of Goražde, with Missis Jovanović and mayor of Goražde, Muhamed Ramović, being one who officially unveiled it.

References

External links 
 Mladi antifašisti - Rade Jovanović
 Sve spremno za prvi međunarodni Festival pjesme i sevdaha „Rade Jovanović Goražde 2005.“ 
 YouTube

1928 births
1986 deaths
Yugoslav musicians
Bosnia and Herzegovina composers
Sevdalinka
Bosnia and Herzegovina poets
Bosnia and Herzegovina musicians
People from Goražde
Serbs of Bosnia and Herzegovina
20th-century poets
20th-century composers
1986 suicides
Suicides in Yugoslavia